These hits topped the Dutch Top 40 in 1976.

See also
1976 in music

References

1976 in the Netherlands
1976 record charts
1976